Pietriș may refer to:

Geography

 Pietriș, a village in Dolhești Commune, Iași County, Romania
 Pietriș, a village in Deda Commune, Mureș County, Romania
 Pietriș, a village in Baldovinești Commune, Olt County, Romania
 Pietriș, a tributary of the Tinoasa in Romania
 Pârâul cu Pietriș, a tributary of the Ghimbav in Romania
 Valea cu Pietriș, a tributary of the Izvorul Dorului in Romania

Surname
Bogdan Pietriș (1945–2006), Romanian painter

See also 
 Piatra (disambiguation)
 Pietreni (disambiguation)
 Pietrari (disambiguation)
 Pietrosu (disambiguation)
 Pietrișu (disambiguation)
 Pietroasa (disambiguation)
 Pietroșani (disambiguation)
 Pietricica (disambiguation)